The White House Fellows program is a non-partisan federal fellowship established via Executive Order by U.S. President Lyndon B. Johnson in October 1964. The fellowship is one of America’s most prestigious programs for leadership and public service, offering exceptional Americans first-hand experience working at the highest levels of the federal government. The fellowship was founded based upon a suggestion from John W. Gardner, then the president of Carnegie Corporation and later the 6th Secretary of Health, Education, and Welfare.

White House Fellows spend a year working as a full-time, paid Fellow to senior White House Staff, Cabinet Secretaries and other top-ranking government officials. Fellows also participate in an Education Program consisting of roundtable discussions with leaders from the private and public sectors. In some years, Fellows may also have the opportunity to study U.S. policy in action domestically, and potentially internationally.
The selection process is very competitive and fellowships are awarded on a strictly non-partisan basis. Each year after the application period closes, the staff of the President's Commission on White House Fellowships (PCWHF) processes the applications and former Fellows screen the applications to identify approximately 100 of the most promising candidates. These selected individuals are then interviewed by several regional panels, which are composed of prominent local citizens. Based on the results of these interviews, the regional panelists and the Director of the PCWHF select approximately 30 candidates to proceed as National finalists. Of the approximately 1,000 applications received, the President's Commission on White House Fellowships will interview the 30 finalists and recommend 11–19 individuals to the President for a one-year appointment as Fellows. Selected civilians serve as Schedule A presidential appointees, while military members will be assigned to duty at the President's Commission on White House Fellowships, 712 Jackson Place, Washington, D.C.

Once Fellows complete their year of service, they join hundreds of other Fellows as alumni of the program. The White House Fellows Foundation and Association is the organization that represents the White House Fellows alumni efforts, leadership events and fundraising activities.

Demographics
White House fellows come from a variety of backgrounds.

 The 10 universities most frequently attended by White House Fellows are, in order: Harvard, Stanford, West Point, Oxford, MIT, Columbia, the Air Force Academy, the Naval Academy, Berkeley, and Yale. 
 The average age of a Fellow is mid-30s. 
 Out of 846 total Fellows from 1965 through 2023, 209 women have been selected as White House Fellows, with the proportion of women varying from a low of 7% during the Johnson administration to a high of 43% during the Obama administration. 
 A broad range of career backgrounds are represented. Fellows' professions include physicians, lawyers, teachers, military officers, scientists, non-profit leaders, engineers, CEOs, entrepreneurs, academics, and many more.

Undergraduate education
 Earned bachelor's degree: 100%
 Attended an Ivy League University: 18%
 Attended a Military Academy: 19%
 Graduated Phi Beta Kappa: 12%
 Rhodes Scholar: 2%

Graduate education
 Earned a graduate degree of any kind: 96%
 Earned a graduate degree from an Ivy League University: 41%

Notable alumni

 1965–1966 Tom Johnson; Former Chairman/CEO, CNN, Former Publisher Los Angeles Times
 1966–1967 Jane Cahill Pfeiffer; Former Chairman, NBC
 1966–1967 Samuel H. Howard; Senior Vice President, Financial Executives Institute; chairman, Federation of American Hospitals; Member of Bipartisan Commission on Medicare under President Bill Clinton; Member of Commission on Social Security under President Ronald Reagan; former National Chairman, Easter Seals
 1967–1968 Preston Townley; former CEO, The Conference Board, former Dean, Carlson School of Management University of Minnesota
 1967–1968 Timothy E. Wirth; President, United Nations Foundation; Former Under Secretary of State for Global Affairs; former Senator, Colorado
 1968–1969 Robert D. Haas; Chairman/CEO, Levi Strauss & Company
 1969–1970 Michael H. Armacost; Shorenstein Distinguished Fellow, Asia–Pacific Research Center, Stanford University; former president, The Brookings Institution; former Ambassador to Japan and the Philippines; former Under Secretary of State for Political Affairs
 1969–1970 Percy A. Pierre; former Assistant Secretary of the U. S. Army for Research, Development and Acquisition, Acting Secretary of the U.S. Army; President, Prairie View A&M University
 1970–1971 Dana G. Mead; former Chairman/CEO, Tenneco, Inc.
 1971–1972 Robert C. McFarlane; chairman and CEO, Energy and Communications Solutions; former National Security Advisor to President Ronald Reagan; former Counselor to the U.S. Department of State; former Special Assistant for National Security Affairs to President Gerald Ford; former Military Assistant to Henry Kissinger and Brent Scowcroft
 1971–1972 Deanell R. Tacha; Judge, United States Court of Appeals for the Tenth Circuit
 1972–1973 Luis G. Nogales; President, Nogales Partners; former CEO, United Press International; former president, Univision
 1972–1973 Joseph P. Carroll; founding President – Secrétaire Perpetuel, Association du Mécénat de l'Institut; founding President – Secrétaire Perpetuel, The American Friends of the Guimet Foundation; Emeritus Member- Board of Visitors, School of Engineering and Applied Science, Columbia University; Philanthropist
 1972–1973 Colin Powell; former Secretary, U.S. Department of State; former chairman, Joint Chiefs of Staff; founding chairman, America's Promise; General, U.S. Army (Ret)
 1973–1974 Doris M. Meissner; Senior Fellow, Migration Policy Institute; former Commissioner, Immigration and Naturalization Service
 1973–1974 Peter M. Dawkins; Vice Chairman, CitiGroup Private Bank; former Chairman/CEO of Primerica Financial Services, Inc.; Heisman Trophy winner; Brigadier General, U.S. Army (Ret)
 1973–1974 Frederick S. Benson III; President, United States – New Zealand Council; former vice president, Weyerhaeuser Company;
 1973–1974 Dr Delano Meriwether; Leukemia researcher; Athlete
 1974–1975 Roger B. Porter; Professor, John F. Kennedy School of Government, Harvard University; Former Assistant for Economic and Domestic Policy to President Ronald Reagan.
 1974–1975 Garrey E. Carruthers; President/CEO, Cimarron Health Plan; former Governor of New Mexico
 1975–1976 Marshall N. Carter; former Chairman/CEO, State Street Bank & Trust Company
 1975–1976 Wesley K. Clark; Chairman/CEO, Wesley K. Clark & Associates; General, U.S. Army (Ret); former Supreme Allied Commander, Europe
 1975–1976 Dennis C. Blair; Admiral, U.S. Navy (Ret); former Director of National Intelligence; former president, Institute for Defense Analyses; former Commander in Chief, U.S. Pacific Command
 1976–1977 Lynn A. Schenk; former Chief Aide and Senior Counselor to former California Governor Gray Davis; former Congresswoman, California
 1976–1977 Charles A. Ansbacher; Conductor, Boston Landmarks Orchestra
 1977–1978 Nelson A. Diaz; Partner, Blank Rome LLP; former City Solicitor, City of Philadelphia; former General Counsel, U.S. Department of Housing and Urban Development
 1979–1980 Lincoln Caplan; author, journalist, Truman Capote Visiting Lecturer in Law and Senior Research Scholar in Law at Yale Law School
 1979–1980 Victoria Chan-Palay; neuroscientist, University of Zurich Medical School
 1979–1980 Anne Cohn Donnelly; former executive director, National Commission for Prevention of Child Abuse
 1979–1980 Marsha J. Evans; President/CEO of American Red Cross; former National Executive Director of the Girl Scouts of the USA; Rear Admiral, U.S. Navy (Ret)
 1980–1981 Joan Abrahamson; President, The Jefferson Institute; President, Jonas Salk Foundation
 1980–1981 Thomas J. Campbell; former U.S. Congressman, California
 1980–1981 M. Margaret McKeown; Judge, U.S. Court of Appeals for the 9th Circuit
 1981–1982 Paul V. Applegarth; CEO, Value Enhancement International; former Founding Managing Director, The Emerging Africa Infrastructure Fund; former Founding CEO, The Millennium Challenge Corporation (U.S. government corporation)
 1981–1982 Joe L. Barton; U.S. Congressman, Texas
 1981–1982 Myron E. Ullman; former CEO, Louis Vuitton Moet Hennessy; former Chairman/CEO, DFS Group, LTD; former Chairman/CEO, R.H. Macy & Company; Chairman & CEO, J.C. Penney
 1982–1983 Maj Gen Scott Gration, USAF (Ret) US Special Envoy to Sudan
 1982–1983 William L. Roper; Dean, School of Medicine, Vice Chairman for Medical Affairs, and CEO, UNC Health Care system, University of North Carolina at Chapel Hill
 1982–1983 Frank Klotz; Lieutenant General, US Air Force; Assistant Vice Chief of Staff, director Air Force Staff (Ret)
 1982–1983 Douglas Kmiec; former U.S. Ambassador to Malta; United States Assistant Attorney General for the Office of Legal Counsel
 1983–1984 Elaine Chao; former Secretary, U.S. Department of Transportation; former Secretary, U.S. Department of Labor; former President/CEO, United Way of America; former Director, Peace Corps
 1983–1984 Mufi Hannemann; Mayor, City and County of Honolulu
 1984–1985 Tom Leppert; Mayor of Dallas; former CEO of Turner Construction Company
 1984–1985 Rick Stamberger; President and CEO, SmartBrief
 1986–1987 Paul A. Gigot; Editor, Editorial page, The Wall Street Journal
 1986–1987 William J. Lennox, Jr.; Lt. General, U.S. Army; Superintendent, United States Military Academy (Ret)
 1987–1988 The Honorable Mary Schiavo; Inspector General, U.S. Department of Transportation; Author, Flying Blind, Flying Safe; Attorney
 1988–1989 Jeff Colyer, Governor of Kansas, Plastic Surgeon, former representative, Medical Volunteer in Afghanistan, Iraq, Rwanda, Balkans, Cambodia, Sierra Leone, and Nairobi embassy bombing
 1988–1989 Charles Patrick Garcia; chairman, Board of Visitors, United States Air Force Academy; Hispanic American leader; former CEO, Sterling Financial Group of Companies; best-selling author of A Message From Garcia and Leadership Lessons of the White House Fellows
 1988–1989 Patrick M. Walsh; retired United States Navy Admiral, Former Commander, U.S. Pacific Fleet, Vice Chief of Naval Operations and Blue Angels pilot (Ret)
 1990–1991 Samuel D. Brownback; former U.S. Senator, Kansas; former Governor of Kansas
 1991–1992 Margarita Colmenares; first Latina engineer at Chevron
 1991–1992 Raymond E. Johns, Jr.; General, US Air Force; Commander, Air Mobility Command (Ret)
 1992–1993 Honorable Kurt M. Campbell Assistant Secretary of State for East Asia
 1992–1993 Robert L. Gordon III Deputy Under-Secretary of Defense, Military Community and Family Policy
 1993–1994 Paul Antony; Chief Medical Officer, PhRMA; Commander, U.S. Navy, Flight Surgeon, Electronic Attack Squadron VAQ-209 "Star Warriors"; Adjunct Faculty, George Washington University Medical Center, Dept of Microbiology, Immunology, & Tropical Medicine
 1993–1994 Honorable W. Scott Gould Deputy Secretary of Veterans Affairs
 1993–1994 Jami Floyd; Degrees in Law from UC Berkeley School of Law and Stanford Law School
 1994–1995 Wifredo Ferrer, U.S. Attorney for the Southern District of Florida
 1995–1996 Kinney Zalesne, co-author of bestselling book and Wall Street Journal column Microtrends
 1996–1997 Brenda Berkman, first female FDNY firefighter
 1997–1998 Dr. Sanjay Gupta; CNN Senior Medical Correspondent, neurosurgeon
 1997–1998 John Burchett; Former Chief of Staff to Governor Jennifer Granholm
 1997–1998 Brad Carson, General Counsel of the Army
 1998–1999 Juan M. Garcia;Asst Secretary of the Navy for Manpower, former representative District 32, Texas House of Representatives
 2000–2001 Dave Aronberg; Florida State Senator, District 27; Special Prosecutor for Prescription Drug Trafficking, Florida Attorney General
 2001–2002 Steve Poizner; California State Insurance Commissioner
 2002–2003 Dr. Rajeev Venkayya, Special Assistant to the President and Senior Director for Biodefense
 2002–2003 Daniel S. Sullivan; Senator from Alaska
 2002–2003 Richard Greco Jr., Assistant Secretary of the Navy (Financial Management and Comptroller) 2004–2006
 2004–2005 Jerry L. Johnson, managing director of RLJ Equity Partners, former Special Assistant to the Secretary of Defense Donald Rumsfeld
 2004–2005 Louis O'Neill, Ambassador to Moldova (OSCE Mission) 2006–2008
 2005–2006 Eric Greitens, Lieutenant Commander in the US Navy and Navy SEAL, Recipient of the Bronze Star, Chairman of the Center for Citizen Leadership, Public Speaker with the Leading Authorities Speakers Bureau; former Governor of Missouri
 2005–2006 Robert Reffkin, co-founder and CEO of Compass Inc.
 2006–2007 Wes Moore, Assistant to Secretary of State Condoleezza Rice, Governor of Maryland
 2008–2009 Nicole Malachowski, US Air Force Colonel (Ret), recipient of the Air Medal and first woman to be a pilot with the Thunderbirds
 2011–2012 Clay Pell
 2011–2012 L. Felice Gorordo; Gorordo served as the White House Fellow to the President's Domestic Policy Advisor Cecilia Muñoz, and worked in the White House Office of Public Engagement and Intergovernmental Affairs
 2013–2014 Elliot Ackerman, served in Marine Corps, five tours of duty in Iraq and Afghanistan.
 2015–2016 Lashanda Holmes, first African-American female helicopter pilot for the Coast Guard.
 2015–2016 Shereef Elnahal, first Muslim American Cabinet member in New Jersey, serving as Commissioner of the New Jersey Department of Health in the Governor Phil Murphy administration.
 2016–2017 Sharice Davids, Congresswoman from Kansas's 3rd congressional district

The President's Commission on White House Fellowships
The Presidents Commission on White House Fellowships (PCWHF) consists of the program office (the Director, staff, and White House Fellows) and the Commission (the commissioners and their Chairperson). The White House Fellows program is a subunit of the White House Office and is located on the 18 acres of the White House grounds. The Director of the PCWHF is appointed by the President, serves as the Designated Federal Officer for the Commission, and is supported by a team of staff members. The Director is responsible for administering all aspects of the program. The Commission meets twice a year and reports to the President of the United States through the Executive Office of the President. The Commission's responsibility is to recommend candidates to the President for selection as White House Fellows. The commissioners help recruit a diverse group of applicants, screen the applicants, and makes recommendations to the President.

Current Commissioners overseeing the White House Fellows Program include:

 Demetra Lambros, chairwoman and former counsel to President Joe Biden
 Karen R. Adler, Senior Vice President of The Adler Group
 Kiran Ahuja, Director of the U.S. Office of Personnel Management
 Raumesh Akbari, Member of the Tennessee Senate
 Cordell Carter II, executive director of the Aspen Institute
 Marco A. Davis, President of the Congressional Hispanic Caucus Institute
 Shirlethia Franklin, Attorney
 George E. Gabriel, Vice President at Northern Virginia Community College
 Robert Hoopes, President at VOX Global
 Nomi Hussain, Attorney
 Joseph Patrick Kennedy III, former Congressman for Massachusetts's 4th congressional district
 Hildy Kuryk, former National Finance Director for Democratic National Committee
 Deborah Jospin, former Director of AmeriCorps
 Nicole Malachowski, Air Force Veteran and 2019 inductee into National Women's Hall of Fame
 Stacey Beth Mindich, Grammy and Tony-winning theatre producer
 Courtney O’Donnell, former senior staffer in the Obama Administration
 Katherine Rice, CEO of Rice Advisory Group
 Ramona Romero, Vice President of Princeton University
 Jennie Rosenthal, board member at Planned Parenthood
 Michael Schrum, Political Director at Emerson Collective
 Kenny Thompson Jr., VP of Corporate Affairs at PepsiCo
 Linda Whitlock, founder of The Whitlock Group
 Fidel Vargas, President of Hispanic Scholarship Fund
 Alfred Yung, Professor of Neuro-Oncology at University of Texas

Former Commissioners overseeing the White House Fellows Program include:

 General Wesley Clark, former NATO commander
 Tom Brokaw, NBC news
 Julie Nixon Eisenhower, daughter of President Richard Nixon
 Tom Daschle, former Senate majority leader
 John H. Frey, CT State Representative and RNC National Committeeman
 President Vartan Gregorian, Carnegie Corporation of New York
 Lieutenant General Claudia J. Kennedy, United States Army
 Maya Lin, Artist
 George Muñoz, former President of the Overseas Private Investment Corporation
 Pierre Omidyar, Founder of eBay
 Paul Sarbanes, former United States Senator from Maryland
 President Ruth J. Simmons, Brown University
 Admiral James Stockdale, Author, Vietnam POW, Medal of Honor (deceased)
 Laurence Tribe, Harvard constitutional scholar
 Gaddi H. Vasquez, former Director of the Peace Corps
 Cindy S. Moelis
 Janet Eissenstat

Directors of the President's Commission on White House Fellowships 
 Rose Vela
 Elizabeth Pinkerton
 Jennifer Kaplan
 Cindy Moelis
 Janet Eissenstat
 Jocelyn White
 Jacqueline Blumenthal
 James C. Roberts

References

External links
 White House Fellows website
White House Fellows Foundation and Association website
President's Commission on White House Fellowships archives: Barack Obama | George W. Bush | Bill Clinton

 
Presidency of the United States
Fellows
1964 establishments in Washington, D.C.
Fellowships